Perotrochus is a genus of large sea snails with gills and an operculum, marine gastropod mollusks in the family Pleurotomariidae, the slit snails, (according to the taxonomy of the Gastropoda by Bouchet & Rocroi, 2005).

Description
The shell has a conical shape. The base is not umbilicated. The whorls are striate or granulate. The anal fasciole is submedian or below the middle. The slit is short.

Species

Extant 
According to the World Register of Marine Species (WoRMS), the following species with valid names are included within the genus Perotrochus:
 † Perotrochus allani Marwick, 1928 
 Perotrochus amabilis (Bayer, 1963)
 Perotrochus anseeuwi Kanazawa & Goto, 1991
 Perotrochus atlanticus Rios & Matthews, 1968
 Perotrochus caledonicus Bouchet & Métivier, 1982
 Perotrochus charlestonensis Askew, 1987
 Perotrochus deforgesi Métivier, 1990
 Perotrochus lucaya Bayer, 1965
 † Perotrochus maoriensis (Wilckens, 1922) 
 † Perotrochus marwicki C. A. Fleming, 1970 
 Perotrochus maureri Harasewych & Askew, 1993
 Perotrochus metivieri Anseeuw & Goto, 1995
 Perotrochus oishii (Shikama, 1973)
 Perotrochus pseudogranulosus Anseeuw, Puillandre, Utge & Bouchet, 2015
 Perotrochus quoyanus (Fischer & Bernardi, 1856)
 Perotrochus sunderlandorum Petuch & Berschauer, 2017
 Perotrochus tosatoi Anseeuw, Goto & Abdi, 2005
 Perotrochus vicdani Kosuge, 1980
 Perotrochus wareni Anseeuw, Puillandre, Utge & Bouchet, 2015
Species brought into synonymy
 Perotrochus africanus (Tomlin, 1948): synonym of Bayerotrochus africanus (Tomlin, 1948)
 Perotrochus boucheti Anseeuw & Poppe, 2001: synonym of Bayerotrochus boucheti (Anseeuw & Poppe, 2001)
 Perotrochus diliculum Okutani, 1979: synonym of Bayerotrochus diluculum (Okutani, 1979)
 Perotrochus gemma F. M. Bayer, 1965: synonym of Perotrochus quoyanus quoyanus (P. Fischer & Bernardi, 1856)
 Perotrochus gotoi Anseeuw, 1990: synonym of Mikadotrochus gotoi (Anseeuw, 1990)
 Perotrochus hirasei (Pilsbry, 1903): synonym of Mikadotrochus hirasei (Pilsbry, 1903)
 Perotrochus indicus Anseeuw, 1999: synonym of Bayerotrochus indicus (Anseeuw, 1999)
 † Perotrochus masoni P. A. Maxwell, 1978: synonym of † Bayerotrochus masoni (P. A. Maxwell, 1978)
 Perotrochus midas Bayer, 1965: synonym of Bayerotrochus midas (Bayer, 1965)
 Perotrochus poppei Anseeuw, 2003: synonym of Bayerotrochus poppei Anseeuw, 2003
 Perotrochus pyramus Bayer, 1967: synonym of Bayerotrochus pyramus (Bayer, 1967)
 Perotrochus tangaroanus Bouchet & Métivier, 1982: synonym of Bayerotrochus tangaroanus (Bouchet & Métivier, 1982)
 Perotrochus teramachii Kuroda, 1955: synonym of Bayerotrochus teramachii (Kuroda, 1955)
 Perotrochus westralis (Whitehead, 1987): synonym of Bayerotrochus westralis (Whitehead, 1987)

Fossil 
 †P. allani , Red Bluff Tuff, New Zealand
 †P. brachoi , Otekaike Limestone, New Zealand
 †P. eocenicus , Kattachi Formation, Japan
 †P. isseli , Sassello (SV), Tertiary Piedmont Basin, Italy
 †P. masoni , Otekaike Limestone, New Zealand (synonym of † Bayerotrochus masoni (P. A. Maxwell, 1978))
 †P. sismondai , Alzey Formation, Germany
 †P. (Perotrochus) hanoverensis, Castle Hayne Formation, North Carolina
 †P. (Entemnotrochus), Capay Formation, California and Swan Cay Formation, Panama
 †Pleurotomaria (Entemnotrochus) baldwini, P. (E.) schencki & P. (E.) siletzensis, Siletz River Volcanics, Oregon

References

Bibliography

Further reading 
 Williams S.T., Karube S. & Ozawa T. (2008) Molecular systematics of Vetigastropoda: Trochidae, Turbinidae and Trochoidea redefined. Zoologica Scripta 37: 483–506

External links
 Fischer, P. (1880-1887). Manuel de conchyliologie et de paléontologie conchyliologique, ou histoire naturelle des mollusques vivants et fossiles suivi d'un Appendice sur les Brachiopodes par D. P. Oehlert. Avec 23 planches contenant 600 figures dessinées par S. P. Woodward.. Paris: F. Savy. Published in 11 parts (fascicules), xxiv + 1369 pp., 23 pls

Pleurotomariidae